Patricia June O'Shane  (born 19 June 1941) is a retired Australian teacher, barrister, public servant, jurist, and Aboriginal activist. She was Australia's first Aboriginal magistrate, serving the Local Court in Sydney, New South Wales, Australia between 1986 until her retirement in 2013.

O'Shane was the first female Aboriginal teacher in Queensland; the first Aboriginal to earn a law degree; the first Aboriginal barrister; and the first woman and Aboriginal person to be the head of a government department in Australia, the New South Wales Ministry of Aboriginal Affairs.

Early life and education
O'Shane was born in Mossman, Queensland on 19 June 1941 to Gladys, an Aboriginal woman, and her husband Patrick 'Tiger' O'Shane, an Irish boxer and unionist. She is an Aboriginal Australian of the Kunjandji clan of the Kuku Yalanji people. O'Shane's mother moved the family from Mossman to Cairns to enable her children to receive a good education. O'Shane ended up the only Aboriginal Australian child in her age group graduating from her high school, gained a scholarship and studied at Teachers' College and the University of Queensland, before teaching at Cairns High School for eight years. When her mother died O'Shane went into a deep depression and was hospitalised. On an Aboriginal Study Grant, O'Shane studied law at the University of New South Wales, graduated in 1976, and was admitted to the New South Wales bar.

Career
O'Shane began practicing law as a barrister with the Aboriginal Legal Service in Sydney and then in Central Australia. O'Shane was head of the New South Wales Ministry of Aboriginal Affairs from 1981 to 1986, before her appointment as a magistrate. She was the Chancellor of the University of New England between 1994 and 2003.

O'Shane was elected to the Australian Constitutional Convention 1998, which considered the issue of Australia becoming a republic. She advocated strongly for an Australian republic. In her opening address, she expressed a want for modification based on what she perceived as historical injustice and inadequacies within the Australian Constitution:

A study in 2012 by Michael Eburn and Ruth Townsend of the Australian National University College of Law examined 56 Supreme Court appeals of cases heard before O'Shane between 1999 and 2012. Of the 56 appeals, 35 (62.5%) were upheld. Of the 16 criminal cases included, 14 appeals were upheld. Eburn and Townsend wrote: "The Supreme Court has found that O'Shane had got the law wrong in 14 out of the 16 criminal cases ... In one case she dismissed a charge even though the accused had entered a plea of guilty." Supreme Court judges criticised O'Shane for "denying the prosecution procedural fairness," and "failure to comprehend the basis of the prosecution case or the evidence before her, use of intemperate language and making numerous errors of law." Eburn and Townsend compared the records of two other magistrates with similar experience and found only eight and nine appeals against them respectively. They called for O'Shane's resignation.

In 2013 O'Shane was awarded a Deadly Award for lifetime achievement in leadership, being praised as a woman who "blazed a path for others to follow . . . she is a genuine and inspiring role model for others". Along with fellow Deadly 2013 winner Archie Roach, she used the win to call for an end to the Northern Territory Intervention.

O'Shane retired as a magistrate in January 2013, taking long service leave until she reached compulsory retirement age in mid-June.

O'Shane ran in the electorate of Leichhardt in North Queensland in the 2022 Australian Federal Election as a candidate for Socialist Alliance.

Awards and honours
1984: Order of Australia, for public service in the field of Aboriginal welfare

2001: Centenary Medal, for service to Australian society and higher education

1998: Voted one of Australia's living treasures by the National Trust

2013: Deadly Awards 2013, Marcia Langton Award For Lifetime Achievement in Leadership

2021: NAIDOC Awards, Lifetime Achievement Award

References

External links 
Fighting for justice

1941 births
Living people
Australian magistrates
Australian women judges
Australian public servants
Australian republicans
Members of the Order of Australia
Recipients of the Centenary Medal
People from Far North Queensland
University of New South Wales Law School alumni
Delegates to the Australian Constitutional Convention 1998
Chancellors of the University of New England (Australia)
University of Queensland alumni
Australian indigenous rights activists
Women human rights activists
Australian people of Irish descent
20th-century Australian women